Cochin Minerals and Rutile Limited (CMRL) is a publicly listed company chemicals company based in Kochi, Kerala, India. The company was founded in 1989 by Dr.S.N. Sasidharan Kartha
with assistance from the Kerala State Industrial Development Corporation (KSIDC). The company is the only listed Indian entity in the synthetic rutile space.

Plant location
Aluva (Kerala) - The plant is located at Edayar Industrial Development Area, which is about 15 kilometers from the Cochin Port and 100 kilometers from the Ilmenite deposits. The company started production with a capacity of 10000 TPA of Synthetic Rutile and 12500 TPA of Ferric Chloride. Subsequent, the company enhanced its production capacity of Synthetic Rutile to 45000 TPA, Ferric Chloride to 24000 TPA, Ferrous Chloride to 72000 TPA and Cemox to 18000 TPA.

Product range
 Beneficiated Ilmenite (Synthetic Rutile)
 Ferric Chloride
 Ferrous Chloride

References

External links
 Official Website

Companies based in Kochi
Chemical companies of India
Mining in Kerala
1989 establishments in Kerala
Indian companies established in 1989
Chemical companies established in 1989
Companies listed on the Bombay Stock Exchange